Stomopteryx is a genus of moths in the family Gelechiidae.

Species
Stomopteryx anxia (Meyrick, 1917)
Stomopteryx argodoris (Meyrick, 1936)
Stomopteryx basalis (Staudinger, 1876)
Stomopteryx bathrarcha Meyrick, 1921
Stomopteryx biangulata Meyrick, 1921
Stomopteryx bivittella (Chrétien, 1915)
Stomopteryx bolschewickiella (Caradja, 1920)
Stomopteryx calligoni Piskunov, 1982
Stomopteryx circaea (Meyrick, 1911)
Stomopteryx cirrhocoma (Meyrick, 1914)
Stomopteryx credula (Meyrick, 1927)
Stomopteryx delotypa (Janse, 1963)
Stomopteryx descarpentriesella (Viette, 1956)
Stomopteryx detersella (Zeller, 1847)
Stomopteryx deverrae (Walsingham, 1905)
Stomopteryx difficilis Janse, 1951
Stomopteryx diplodoxa Meyrick, 1936
Stomopteryx discolorella Turati, 1924
Stomopteryx elaeocoma (Meyrick, 1918)
Stomopteryx eremopis (Meyrick, 1921)
Stomopteryx falkovitshi Piskunov, 1987
Stomopteryx flavipalpella Jäckh, 1959
Stomopteryx flavoclavella Zerny, 1935
Stomopteryx frivola Meyrick, 1926
Stomopteryx gaesata (Meyrick, 1913)
Stomopteryx geryella (Chrétien, 1915)
Stomopteryx grandidierella (Viette, 1956)
Stomopteryx hungaricella Gozmány, 1957
Stomopteryx kermella Chrétien, 1915
Stomopteryx lacteolella Turati, 1924
Stomopteryx lineolella Eversmann, 1844
Stomopteryx luticoma (Meyrick, 1929)
Stomopteryx maculatella (Lucas, 1956)
Stomopteryx maledicta Meyrick, 1921
Stomopteryx maraschella (Caradja, 1920)
Stomopteryx mongolica Povolný, 1975
Stomopteryx multilineatella (Lucas, 1932)
Stomopteryx neftensis (Dufrane, 1955)
Stomopteryx nigricella (Chrétien, 1915)
Stomopteryx nugatricella Rebel, 1893
Stomopteryx ochrosema Meyrick, 1932
Stomopteryx officiosa Janse, 1951
Stomopteryx oncodes (Meyrick, 1913)
Stomopteryx orthogonella (Staudinger, 1871)
Stomopteryx pallidella Amsel, 1959
Stomopteryx pallidipes Janse, 1951
Stomopteryx pelomicta Meyrick, 1928
Stomopteryx phaeopa Meyrick, 1918
Stomopteryx plurivittella (Turati, 1930)
Stomopteryx praecipitata Meyrick, 1918
Stomopteryx prolapsa Meyrick, 1918
Stomopteryx quadripunctella Chrétien, 1915
Stomopteryx radicalis Falkovitsh & Bidzilya, 2003
Stomopteryx rastrifera Meyrick, 1918
Stomopteryx remissella (Zeller, 1847)
Stomopteryx schizogynae (Walsingham, 1908)
Stomopteryx speciosella Zerny, 1936
Stomopteryx sphenodoxa Meyrick, 1931
Stomopteryx splendens (Staudinger, 1881)
Stomopteryx subnigricella (Dufrane, 1955)
Stomopteryx symplegadopa Meyrick, 1936
Stomopteryx tenuisignella Turati, 1924
Stomopteryx tesserapunctella (Amsel, 1935)
Stomopteryx thoracica (Meyrick, 1911)
Stomopteryx trachyphylla Janse, 1960
Stomopteryx xanthobasalis (Janse, 1963)
Stomopteryx xerochroa (Meyrick, 1921)
Stomopteryx zanoni Turati, 1922

Former species
Stomopteryx elachistella (Stainton, 1859)

References

 , 2007, Esperiana Buchreihe zur Entomologie Memoir 4: 91-116.
 , 1975: Stomopteryx mongolica sp. n. aus der Mongolei (Lepidoptera, Gelechiidae). Annales historico-naturales Musei nationalis hungarici 67: 177-181.

 
Anacampsini